Zambia Skyways was an airline based in Lusaka, Zambia. The airline, which formerly traded as Eastern Air.

Zambia Skyways started flying, as Eastern Air, in 1993. The airline had two light aircraft, which were joined by a Let 410 18 seater in 1997.

In 1999, Eastern Air changed its name to Zambia Skyways.

Zambia Skyways had resumed services partially in 2009, with flights to Dubai and London through a partnership with Air Zimbabwe in which the airline was allowed to use Air Zimbabwe's Boeing 737 and Boeing 767 aircraft for the flights between Lusaka and London, Dubai, Lubumbashi and Harare.

References

Airlines established in 1993
1993 establishments in Zambia